Busy is an unincorporated community located in Perry County, Kentucky, United States.

A post office called Busy was established in 1924. The community was so named on account of its enterprising citizens (i.e. "busy as bees"). Busy has been noted for its unusual place name.

References

Unincorporated communities in Perry County, Kentucky
Unincorporated communities in Kentucky